Phillip Ssozi (born 23 July 1982 in Kampala) is a retired Ugandan international football player.

Club career
Phillip started his senior career in the Ugandan leading club Villa SC having won five national Championships in a row. In December 2003 he moved to Europe, to play in Serbia in the Serbian First League (2nd Serbian tier). That club is known for bringing many Ugandan players to Europe, but after ending that season, Ssozi was back to Africa, this time to play in Rwandan leading club APR FC from the country's capital Kigali. There he won that year, 2005, the Rwandan Premier League. After that season, he was back to Uganda where he first played in Kampala's Victor FC and, since 2007 is playing in another capital's club, the Express Red Eagles.

International career
Since 1999, Ssozi had played 22 matches for the Uganda national football team, scoring 2 goals.

Honours
 Villa
Ugandan Super League: 1998, 1999, 2000, 2001, 2002, 2002–03, 2004
Ugandan Cup: 1998, 2000, 2002
CECAFA Clubs Cup: 2003
East African Hedex Super Cup: 1999-00

 APR
Rwandan Premier League: 2005

 Express
Ugandan Super League: 2011–12

References

Living people
1982 births
Sportspeople from Kampala
Ugandan footballers
Uganda international footballers
FK Srem players
Serbian First League players
Ugandan expatriate sportspeople in Serbia
Expatriate footballers in Serbia
APR F.C. players
Expatriate footballers in Rwanda
Association football midfielders
SC Villa players
Ugandan expatriate sportspeople in Rwanda
Express FC players